The KORG Poly-61 (PS-61) is an analogue programmable polyphonic synthesizer released by Korg in 1982, as a successor to the Polysix.  It was notable for being Korg's first largely "knobless" synthesizer - featuring a push-button interface for programming, dispensing with the Polysix's knobs and switches.  The Poly-61 also uses digitally-controlled analog oscillators or DCOs (Roland's Juno-6 had made the same leap the previous year), in place of the Polysix's VCOs. The Poly-61 also boasted double the patch memory (64 memory positions versus the Polysix's 32), but did not feature its predecessor's onboard effects.

In 1984, a MIDI version, the Poly-61M, was released featuring basic MIDI implementation, however, prior to that, one could order a Poly-61 with MIDI In and MIDI Out jacks factory-installed, simply called Poly-61 with Factory Installed MIDI. The MIDI implementation was basic with only note-on and note-off information, partly as the synthesiser was not touch sensitive.

Audio path

Oscillators
The Poly-61 offers two DCOs per voice. DCO1, a more traditional design, provides sawtooth, pulse, and PWM waveforms. DCO2, based on low-resolution counter ICs, has only sawtooth and square, and is not available on its own.

Filter
The filter has the typical controls for cutoff, resonance, keyboard tracking and envelope amount. Some of these are rather limited by the  parameter resolution. Keyboard tracking is simply "on" or "off" for example, and resonance and envelope level (here labelled "EG Intensity") have only 8 values. However, when manipulated by internal LFOs, the resolution is considerably better without notable stepping.

Output
The final component in the audio path is a VCA. It can be driven by the envelope generator or a CV/Gate pulse.

Embedded processors
NEC D8049C - 8 bits, 11 MHz (max.), 40 pins (DIP), Supply Voltage = 5V

There are 2 of them on the CPU board (KLM-509), one is a Programmer and the other is an Assigner.

The 8049 has 2 kB of masked ROM as well as 128 bytes of RAM and 27 I/O ports. The µC's oscillator block divides the incoming clock into 15 internal phases, thus with its 11 MHz max. crystal, one gets 0.73 MIPS (of one-clock instructions). Some 70% of instructions are single byte/cycle, but 30% need two cycles and/or two bytes, so raw performance is closer to 0.5 MIPS. The minimum instruction length is 8 bits and the maximum instruction length is 16 bits.

Modulation

Envelope generator
The envelope is an ADSR type. All parameters can only be set to one of 16 values.

There are 6 SSM-2056 analog envelope generator chips used in the Poly 61, each being controlled by discrete 4-bit D/A converters.  This means there are only 16 possible settings for each of the ADSR parameters.

LFO
The LFO (known as a 'modulation generator' on the Poly-61) is a simple triangle wave that can be routed to the DCOs or VCF. It has a variable delay before it is triggered.

Joystick
The joystick controls a second LFO, adjustable by a knob with rate indicator LED, and entirely independent of the main LFO, although the effect can be cumulative.  The joystick can be used to route this to DCO pitch (vibrato) or VCF.  As control of this LFO is entirely manual, it does not feature in the programmable patch structure of the synth.

Performance features

Joystick
Unlike the separate pitch and modulation wheels of the Polysix, the Poly 61 features a full joystick, with variable pitchbend (+/- about 7 semitones), and an independent LFO (see above).

Chord memory
As well as standard 6-voice polyphony, a chord memory can be engaged, memorising any chord voicing held down while pressing the Chord Memory button.  This chord is then replicated, its lowest note matching any note played on the keyboard.  A hold function works in either Poly or Chord mode, with a dedicated input jack for a release foot pedal.

Arpeggiator
There is a simple arpeggiator with dedicated control buttons and tempo knob, which can work in conjunction with the chord memory for moderately sophisticated sequences.

Reception and Impact

The Poly-61 was not as well received as its predecessor, in particular the push button programming interface being criticised for its lack of resolution compared to the knob-controlled analog synths of the period; this would foreshadow general criticisms of the menu diving required to edit patches 'on the fly' whilst playing that would be directed at the digital and sample-based synths that were to follow.  The Poly-61 also lacked the on-board effects capability of the Polysix.

Crucially, the Poly-61 was released just before the introduction of MIDI, and still used old style analog voltage trigger outputs to interface it with sequencers and drum machines (although this was addressed by the later addition of MIDI in the Poly-61M).  However, it would be the release of the all-digital Yamaha DX7 just a few months after the Poly-61 that would quickly erode its market appeal.  The Poly-61 was replaced in 1985 by the DW-8000 which still used a partially analog architecture.  It was not until the revolutionary Korg M1 six years later, that Korg returned to the top of the class with the first sample-based digital workstation synth.

Notable users
 Com Truise
 Cardiacs
 FM Static
 Homeshake
 Jesse Saunders
 Kanjo
 Ray Parker Jr.  "Ghostbusters"
 The Faint
 Twenty Four Hours
 Tuxedomoon
 J McCarthy
 Brian Auger
 Kebu

References 

P
Analog synthesizers
Polyphonic synthesizers